Juan Sebastián Cabal and Robert Farah were the defending champions but chose not to participate this year.
Dominic Inglot and Robert Lindstedt won the title, defeating Eric Butorac and Scott Lipsky in the final, 6–2, 6–4.

Seeds

Draw

Draw

References
Main Draw

Winston-Salem Open - Doubles
2015 Doubles